Prototypes are an indie rock band from France.

Personnel
The band comprises:

Stephane Bodin (bass, synths)
Isabelle Le Doussal (vocals), known on-stage as "Bubble Star"
François Marche (guitar)

History
In 2006, a song from the band's U.S. self-titled debut album, "Who's Gonna Sing?", was featured in an advertisement for the Apple iPod Shuffle.

In 2008, their song "Je ne te connais pas" ("I do not know you") was featured in a Mitsubishi Outlander commercial.  The same song was also featured in a BMW 1 Series television commercial in Germany in 2007, as well as in an episode of The L Word.

In 2010, the song "Je Ne Te Connais" was featured in Gossip Girl season 4 episode 2, "Double Identity."

Discography

Albums

Tout le monde cherche quelque chose à faire (2004)
Mutants Médiatiques (2005)
Prototypes (2006) - first U.S. album with tracks from their previous two French albums
Synthétique (2008)

References

External links 
Prototypes Online at Universal Music
Live on 89.3 The Current at South by Southwest 2007

French indie rock groups
Musical groups established in 2003
Musical groups from Paris